Something About Us may refer to:
 "Something About Us" (Daft Punk song)
 "Something About Us" (No Angels song)